Yerzovka is an urban locality (an urban-type settlement) in Gorodishchensky District of Volgograd Oblast, Russia. Population:

References

Urban-type settlements in Volgograd Oblast
Tsaritsynsky Uyezd